Dispatches is a New Journalism book by Michael Herr that describes the author's experiences in Vietnam as a war correspondent for Esquire magazine. First published in 1977, Dispatches was one of the first pieces of American literature that portrayed the experiences of soldiers in the Vietnam War for American readers. 

"Dispatches" arrived late. Herr served as Esquire’s correspondent from 1967 to 1969, and returned to the United States intending to produce a book about what he’d seen there immediately, but 18 months after his return, he suffered a nervous breakdown due to the events that he witnessed and stopped writing for five years, until it was ultimately published in 1977. 

Featured in the book are fellow war correspondents Sean Flynn, Dana Stone, and Dale Dye, and photojournalist Tim Page.

Dispatches was reprinted in 2009 by Everyman's Library as a contemporary classic.

Reception
John le Carré called Dispatches "the best book I have ever read on men and war in our time." It was featured in the journalism section of The Guardians 100 greatest non-fiction book list in 2011.

However, after publishing Dispatches, Herr disclosed that parts of the book were invented, and that it would be better for it not to be regarded as journalism. In a 1990 interview with Los Angeles Times, he admitted that the characters Day Tripper and Mayhew in the book are "totally fictional characters", and went on to say:

Similarly, in a separate interview with Eric James Schroeder, he said:

In screenplays
Herr worked on the narration for the movie Apocalypse Now and co-wrote the screenplay for the movie Full Metal Jacket and several scenes and pieces of dialogue used in the book were later also used in those movies.

References

1977 non-fiction books
Vietnam War books
Non-fiction novels
Non-fiction books about war
Alfred A. Knopf books